The 1980–81 Purdue Boilermakers men's basketball team represented Purdue University during the 1980–81 college basketball season. The Boilermakers were led by first-year head coach Gene Keady and finished with an overall record of 21–11 (10–8 Big Ten).

Roster

Schedule and results

|-
!colspan=9 style=|Non-Conference Regular Season

|-
!colspan=9 style=|Big Ten Regular Season

|-
!colspan=9 style=|National Invitation Tournament

References

Purdue Boilermakers men's basketball seasons
Purdue
Purdue
Purdue Boilermakers men's basketball
Purdue Boilermakers men's basketball